Samaira is a given name. Notable people with the name include:

Samaira Mehta, American coder and inventor
Samaira Rao (born 1989), Indian actress

Fictional
Samaira Dean, from Daybreak (2019 TV series)